Zanthoxylum ailanthoides, also called ailanthus-like prickly ash, (lit. "Ailanthus-leaved pepper", lit. "Yue pepper", 食茱萸 shi zhu yu, lit. "crow prickly ash") is an Asiatic plant of the prickly-ash genus Zanthoxylum, natively occurring in forest-covered parts of southeastern China, Taiwan, Southeast Asia, and Japan from Honshu southward. The piquant fruit serves as a local substitute for the ordinary red-pepper in China before the Columbian exchange. In Taiwan, the young leaves are used in cuisines.

Though some refer to the species as "Japanese prickly-ash", that name is confusing since it is sometimes applied to the sanshō which is Z. piperitum. Z. ailanthoides is not normally exploited for human consumption in Japan, except by the prehistoric people from the Jōmon period. It is foraged in the wild by the Japanese macaque.

A regional nickname is tara, and in fact, its young shoots are often mistaken for the true tara (Aralia elata) by gatherers of wild plants. The Latin name ailanthoides of the species comes from its leaves resembling those of the Ailanthus.
 
Like other genera of plants in the rue family, it serves as the host food plant for the larvae of several Asian swallowtail butterfly species, such as Papilio bianor, Papilio helenus, Papilio protenor, and Papilio xuthus.

References

Sources
 PDF

Trees of China
Trees of Japan
Chinese condiments
Taiwanese cuisine
Herbs
Leaf vegetables
ailanthoides